Newtown is an unincorporated community in Mingo County, West Virginia, United States. Newtown has a post office with ZIP code 25686.

The Hatfield Cemetery, near Newtown, is listed on the National Register of Historic Places.

References

Unincorporated communities in Mingo County, West Virginia
Unincorporated communities in West Virginia